Rosendo "Dodoy" Labadlabad (born March 1, 1965) is a Filipino politician from the province of Zamboanga del Norte. He currently serves as mayor of the municipality of Sindangan, Zamboanga del Norte since 2019, and previously served as a member of the Philippine House of Representatives from the 2nd legislative district of Zamboanga del Norte from 2007 to 2016.

During his term as a congressman, Labadlabad became known to have initiated the construction of covered courts in many barangays that covers the area of the 2nd Congressional District of Zamboanga del Norte. He was also known in his steps of building classrooms for children in inter-barangay schools as part of his belief in valuing education.

Labadlabad’s popularity continues when he became the local chief executive of Sindangan, better known in his vision to convert the municipality into a component city by the end of his term. During his term as mayor, he was able to remodel the town and built ambitious projects such as the Sindangan River Boardwalk, the Cultural and Sports Complex, Musical and Dancing Fountain, Sindangan Public Market, and bringing an extension campus of the Mindanao State University to his town.

Controversies
In 2017, Dodoy sued DXFL radio personality Nick Carbonel for libel. Claims on misinformation alleging the former representative at the time were unclear.
In 2019, Dodoy and his wife, Representative Glona Labadlabad, were charged with obstruction of justice for harboring a self-confessed killer of a certain murder incident that occurred in the neighboring town of Siayan, Zamboanga del Norte.

Electoral history

References

|-

|-

Living people
Politicians from Zamboanga del Norte
PDP–Laban politicians
Mayors of places in Zamboanga del Norte
Members of the House of Representatives of the Philippines from Zamboanga del Norte
1965 births